Petar Lambić (born February 1, 1992) is a Serbian professional basketball player. Standing at  he plays at the shooting guard position.

External links
 Petar Lambić at eurobasket.com
 Petar Lambić at fiba.com

1992 births
Living people
Basketball League of Serbia players
KK Hemofarm players
KK Vojvodina Srbijagas players
KK Proleter Zrenjanin players
KK Smederevo players
Serbian men's basketball players
Shooting guards
Sportspeople from Zrenjanin
Serbian expatriate basketball people in Bulgaria